"Eyes, Nose, Lips" is a song recorded by South Korean singer Taeyang, serving as the second single for his second studio album Rise (2014). It was written by Teddy and Taeyang. The song peaked atop the Gaon Digital Chart and the K-pop Hot 100, and went on to become the second best-performing single of 2014.

Background and composition 
On May 29, 2014, YG Entertainment announced the song as the title track of the album, and will be released simultaneously with the album on June 3, with the music video. Taeyang talked about the song with Billboard, saying it was the last song that was completed from the album, and was the reason of releasing the album. He also described the process of creating the song, saying, "While Teddy was writing out the chords, Becca came along and wrote out the melody on the spot. I liked it so much, and I believed I could put a fresh feel to it with my voice. After finishing the demo recordings, I discussed my personal experiences with Teddy, which he thought would be cool to incorporate as lyrics. We were able to write a song together about missing an old lover, reminiscing about their eyes, nose and lips. It's a very emotional track.".

"Eyes, Nose, Lips" was described as "an R&B-style song with a solid piano sound" accompanying the singer's "appealing vocals." Composed using common time in the key of  C major, with a moderate tempo of 72 to 76 beats per minute, the song features the lyrics "I can’t erase you even when you’re gone / I still remember your eyes, nose, lips, touch and your small nails," and "Can I ever see you again just for a moment, or even by chance / I get anxious day by day" that expresses a faint longing for the past loved one. The Star Online noted that the track is a "heartfelt love song that's heavy on the piano and low on audio enhancements."

Promotion 
Taeyang's performed the song for the first time was on Inkigayo on June 6, 2014. His second comeback stage which was on M! Countdown. He also performed it at the talk show You Hee-yeol's Sketchbook.

On June 15, YG Entertainment announced a "cover project" in which its artists will be covering songs from others. Akdong Musician were the first to release a cover of "Eyes, Nose, Lips." Tablo covered the song with a rap version and Taeyang appeared during its bridge part. Lydia Paek was the third YG Family artist to cover the song for the project.

Critical reception
"Eyes, Nose, Lips" received universal acclaim, being named one of the best songs of the year and winning many awards. Melody L. Goh from The Star Online wrote that Taeyang "may have just hit musical gold" with the song, while Douglas Markowitz of Miami New Times stated that, "even if you can't understand the lyrics, you can feel the passion in his voice." Jakob Dorof of Noisey described the single as "painfully pretty as must be the girl it describes" and complimented the single's "carefully counted build towards one of the year's most well deserved key change catharses." Scott Interrante of PopMatters wrote that "Eyes, Nose, Lips" is "emotionally powerful" and admired Tayeang's vocals and the music video. Additionally, Kult Scene said that Taeyang "lets the listeners feel the sadness and anger of the situation stated in the track" and added that "Eyes, Nose, Lips" is the most vulnerable song from the singer and "one that will go down as one of his best songs."

Commercial performance
Upon its release, the song debuted at number one on Gaon's Digital and Download charts, selling 322,577 copies on its first week. On the Streaming Chart, the single reached a peak position of number one on its second week, following a top three debut. "Eyes, Nose, Lips" remained at the first position in the Streaming Chart for five consecutive weeks. The song topped the June monthly Digital, Download and Streaming charts, with 765,833 downloads with 21.7 streams. "Eyes, Nose, Lips" was the second best performing single of 2014 in South Korea, with 1,613,109 downloads and 74.7 million streams by the end of the year.

"Eyes, Nose, Lips" debuted on Billboards K-Pop Hot 100 at number 34. The following week the song jumped to number one on the chart, giving Taeyang his first solo chart-topper and his third overall, counting with his band Big Bang's two number ones. The song charted third on Billboards World Digital Singles.

Accolades

Charts

Weekly charts

Monthly charts

Year-end charts

Sales

References 

Korean-language songs
Taeyang songs
2014 singles
2014 songs
YG Entertainment singles
Gaon Digital Chart number-one singles
Songs written by Teddy Park